Once Upon a Dream is a 1949 British comedy romance film directed by Ralph Thomas in his debut and starring Googie Withers, Griffith Jones, and Guy Middleton. It was a J. Arthur Rank presentation and a Sydney Box production, and was released through General Film Distributors Ltd. The film was made at the Lime Grove Studios with sets designed by the art director Cedric Dawe.

Plot
Just after World War II, former army officer Major Gilbert returns home, shortly after his service batman, Jackson, whom he has taken on as his butler. The major's wife, Carol, is offended that her husband pays her little attention before going off to bed, saying he is exhausted after his journey. That night, she has a romantic dream about Jackson and as a result of a coincidence of events as she wakes up, she believes it actually happened and becomes indignant when Jackson does not act accordingly. Meanwhile, Carol's shop is in financial difficulties, and she needs help from the major's rich aunt with whom she cannot get along.

Cast
 Googie Withers as Carol Gilbert
 Griffith Jones as Jackson
 Guy Middleton as Major Gilbert
 Betty Lynne as Mlle Louise
 David Horne as Registrar
 Geoffrey Morris as Registrar's Clerk
 Raymond Lovell as Mr. Trout
 Noel Howlett as Solicitor
 Agnes Lauchlan as Aunt Agnes
 Mirren Wood as Conductress
 Hubert Gregg as Captain Williams
 Maurice Denham as Vicar
 Mona Washbourne as Vicar's Wife
 Nora Nicholson as 1st W.V.S.
 Dora Bryan as Barmaid
 Hal Osmond as Bailiff
 Arthur Denton as Janitor
 Eric Messiter as Pontefact
 Gibb McLaughlin as Pontefact
 Cecil Bevan as Wright
 Wilfred Caithness as Pontefact

Production
Margaret Lockwood refused to do the film and was put on suspension by Rank. She said when she read the script - then called Roses for Her Pillow - "as I reached the last page I hurled the manuscript across the room. I had never been so angry." She complained to her agent "how dare they offer me a part like that... It's no more than that of a stooge." Her agent tried to see if they could improve it but Lockwood said "I would not listen. This time no one was going to make me change my mind. I did not care what anyone said. I was sick of getting mediocre parts and poor scripts."

Ralph Thomas was head of the trailer department for the Rank Film Organisation. He had made a number of trailers for producer Sydney Box, including one for the film Miranda (1948) which Box liked. "He was particularly taken with it," said Thomas. When the original director for Once Upon a Dream fell ill, Box offered Thomas the chance to direct. It was on this film that Thomas met Box's sister Betty, who would go on to make over 20 films with Thomas.

Reception
By 1953 the film earned a net revenue of £79,000.

Allmovie noted, "More silly than funny, Once Upon a Dream is kept alive by the enthusiastic performances of its leading players."

References

External links

1949 films
1940s English-language films
1949 romantic comedy films
Films directed by Ralph Thomas
Films shot at Pinewood Studios
British romantic comedy films
Films set in London
British black-and-white films
Films shot at Lime Grove Studios
Gainsborough Pictures films
1949 directorial debut films
Films with screenplays by Patrick Kirwan
Films about dreams
1940s British films